Quezon City's 6th congressional district is one of the six congressional districts of the Philippines in Quezon City. It has been represented in the House of Representatives of the Philippines since 2013. Previously included in the 2nd district, it includes the barangays bordering the southern enclave of Caloocan more popularly known as Balintawak and the Tandang Sora area. Primarily residential, it is currently represented in the 19th Congress by Ma. Victoria Co-Pilar of the National Unity Party (NUP).

Representation history

Election results

2013

2016

2019

2022

See also
Legislative districts of Quezon City

References

Congressional districts of the Philippines
Politics of Quezon City
2012 establishments in the Philippines
Congressional districts of Metro Manila
Constituencies established in 2012